The 2018 PowerShares QQQ 300 was the 1st stock car race of the 2018 NASCAR Xfinity Series season, and the 37th iteration of the event. The race was held on Saturday, February 17, 2018 in Daytona Beach, Florida at Daytona International Speedway, a 2.5 miles (4.0 km) permanent triangular-shaped superspeedway. The race was extended from the scheduled 120 laps to 143 laps due to five NASCAR overtime attempts. At race's end, Tyler Reddick of JR Motorsports would best out teammate Elliott Sadler in the closest finish in NASCAR history, beating Sadler out by only 0.0004 seconds. To fill out the podium, Ryan Reed of Roush Fenway Racing would finish 3rd.

Background 

Daytona International Speedway is one of three superspeedways to hold NASCAR races, the other two being Indianapolis Motor Speedway and Talladega Superspeedway. The standard track at Daytona International Speedway is a four-turn superspeedway that is 2.5 miles (4.0 km) long. The track's turns are banked at 31 degrees, while the front stretch, the location of the finish line, is banked at 18 degrees.

Entry list

Practice

First practice 
First practice was held on Friday, February 16, at 12:05 PM EST.

Second practice 
The second and final practice  was held on Friday, February 16, at 2:05 PM EST.

Qualifying 
Qualifying would take place on Saturday, February 17, at 9:35 AM EST. Since Daytona International Speedway is at least , the qualifying system was a single car, single lap, two round system where in the first round, everyone would set a time to determine positions 13-40. Then, the fastest 12 qualifiers would move on to the second round to determine positions 1-12.

The drivers that would fail to qualify would consist of: Ray Black Jr., Chris Cockrum, Timmy Hill, Morgan Shepherd, Josh Bilicki, and Mike Harmon. Originally, Timmy Hill was slated to qualify for the race after qualifying on owner's points, supposed to be starting in 36th. However, the times of Matt Tifft and Josh Williams were both disallowed after they both failed post-qualifying inspection. This would allow Gray Gaulding, previously a non-qualifier, to make the race and bump Hill out of the race.

Full starting lineup 

*Times disallowed after Tifft and Williams both failed post-qualifying inspection.

Race results 
Stage 1 Laps: 30

Stage 2 Laps: 30

Stage 3 Laps: 83

References 

2018 NASCAR Xfinity Series
NASCAR races at Daytona International Speedway
PowerShares QQQ 300
PowerShares QQQ 300